"So Serious" is a song by the rock music group Electric Light Orchestra (ELO) from their 1986 album Balance of Power, released in the UK as the second single from the album in 1986.

Overview 
The song's lyrics hint at Jeff Lynne's growing disenchantment with his involvement with ELO at this point; much like the majority of the songs from the album, the lyrical content was in sharp contrast to the upbeat synthpop of the album.

ELO writer Barry Delve describes it as "a cheerful canter that betrays a darker lyric about the breakdown of a relationship and wanting to 'talk it over'" and a "pleasant enough pop song, reminiscent of something the Cars might have done in their early years but...lightweight by ELO standards."

There was also a UK 12 inch EPIC three-track version with "A Matter of Fact (Alternate Lyrics)" on the B-Side.

Reception
Cash Box said it "has a classic ELO melody hook" and "a serious shot for wide radio attention."

Delve says it has "at least four great hooks" but with "one quite irritating hook" and that overall the song is "very much a chorus in search of a song."  Biographer and music writer John Van der Kiste called it a "deceptively upbeat number, failing to conceal a sad theme, with the narrator lying awake night after night as he tries to fit it all together."

Track listing
All songs written by Jeff Lynne.

7-inch single
"So Serious" – 2:38
"A Matter of Fact" – 4:04

12-inch single
"So Serious" – 2:38
"A Matter of Fact" – 4:04
"A Matter of Fact" (alternate lyrics) – 3:49

12-inch single
"So Serious" - 2:38
"A Matter of Fact" - 4:04
"Destination Unknown" - 4:10

Chart positions

References

1986 songs
Electric Light Orchestra songs
Song recordings produced by Jeff Lynne
Songs written by Jeff Lynne